is a Japanese football player. He plays for Cerezo Osaka.

Career
Daichi Matsuoka joined Cerezo Osaka in 2016. On June 12, he debuted in J3 League (v Kataller Toyama).

References

External links

1999 births
Living people
Association football people from Toyama Prefecture
Japanese footballers
J2 League players
J3 League players
Cerezo Osaka players
Cerezo Osaka U-23 players
Association football forwards